Jhonnathan Espedito Coco Wagner (born 4 March 2001), simply known as Jhonnathan, is a Brazilian footballer who plays for ABC, on loan from Santos. Mainly a central defender, he can also play as a defensive midfielder.

Club career
Born in Foz do Iguaçu, Paraná, Jhonnathan joined Santos' youth setup in March 2018, from Inter de Limeira. On 14 May 2018, he signed a youth contract with Santos.

In October 2019, Jhonnathan signed his first professional contract with the club, until September 2021. He made his first team debut for Peixe on 3 March 2021, coming on as a second-half substitute for Wagner Leonardo in a 1–1 Campeonato Paulista home draw against Ferroviária.

On 19 May 2021, Jhonnathan renewed his contract until April 2026. After failing to appear in any further match for the first team, he was loaned to Série C side Brasil de Pelotas on 20 June 2022.

On 28 November 2022, Santos agreed to loan Jhonnathan to ABC for the 2023 season.

Career statistics

References

External links

2001 births
Living people
People from Foz do Iguaçu
Sportspeople from Paraná (state)
Brazilian footballers
Association football defenders
Campeonato Brasileiro Série C players
Santos FC players
Grêmio Esportivo Brasil players
ABC Futebol Clube players